The Doubles race of the 2015 FIL World Luge Championships was held on 14 February 2015.

Results
The first run was started at 10:25 and the second run at 11:30.

References

Doubles